Hamorton is an unincorporated community and census-designated place (CDP) in Chester County, Pennsylvania, United States. It was first listed as a CDP prior to the 2020 census.

The CDP is primarily in southern Chester County, in the northeast part of Kennett Township. U.S. Route 1 passes through the community, leading east (northbound)  to Chadds Ford and west (southbound) the same distance to Kennett Square. Pennsylvania Route 52 intersects Route 1 in Hamorton, leading southeast  to Wilmington, Delaware, and northeast  to West Chester.

The Hamorton Historic District, listed on the National Register of Historic Places, comprises 75 historic buildings in the north part of the CDP along US 1.

Demographics

References 

Census-designated places in Chester County, Pennsylvania
Census-designated places in Pennsylvania